A postcard or post card is a rectangular piece of thick paper or thin cardboard intended for writing and mailing without an envelope.

Postcard may also refer to:

Arts and entertainment

Books 
The Post Card: From Socrates to Freud and Beyond, a 1980 book by French philosopher Jacques Derrida
The Postcard, a 2009 children's novel by Tony Abbott

Film 
 Postcard (2010 film), a 2010 Japanese film
 Postcard (2014 film), a 2014 Indian film

Music

Albums 
 Post Card, album by Mary Hopkin

Songs 
 "Postcard"  (The Who song), by The Who from Odds & Sods
 "Postcard" (Steven Wilson song), by Steven Wilson from Grace for Drowning
 "The Postcard", by Boris Grebenshchikov from Radio Silence
 "Postcard", by The Hollies from Butterfly
 "Postcard", by The Huntingtons from Self-titled Album
 "Postcard", by Iron & Wine from Archive Series Volume No. 1
 "Postcard", by The Lemonheads from Creator
 "Postcard", by Troye Sivan featuring Gordi from Bloom
 "Postcard", by First Aid Kit (band)

Technology 
 POST card, a computer diagnostic tool

See also 
 Postcards (disambiguation)